Streets of Compton is the  soundtrack by American rapper the Game. It was released on June 17, 2016, by Blood Money Entertainment and eOne Music. The album features guest appearances from Problem, Boogie, J3, AD, Micah, Payso, and AV. It also has production from League of Starz, DeUno, Tone Mason, Bongo, Phonix, and Jelly Roll. The album is supported by the lone single, "Roped Off".

Background
Streets of Compton is a soundtrack album to support his show on A&E with the same name. It is a three-part documentary series that aired on June 9, 2016. The series feature interviews with several Compton residents and delve into Compton's recent past and attempt to explain how drugs, gangs, and political strife helped give birth to one Compton's rich musical and cultural history.

Commercial performance 
Streets of Compton debuted at number 25 on the US Billboard 200, with 20,000 equivalent album units; it sold 15,000 copies in its first week, and boasted over 3 million streams. As of July 24, 2016 Streets of Compton has sold over 25,000 copies in pure album sales not including streams.

Critical reception

Exclaim!'s Rob Boffard gave the album a mixed to negative review, writing that it "feels a cynical attempt to benefit from the massive interest in Compton, a contractually obliged soundtrack album for an A&E documentary series of the same name."

Track listing

Charts

References

2016 soundtrack albums
The Game (rapper) albums
Albums produced by JellyRoll
Albums produced by Tone Mason